VUDA Park or VMRDA Park is an urban park located near RK Beach in Visakhapatnam, Andhra Pradesh, India. It is operated by the Visakhapatnam Metropolitan Region Development Authority (VMRDA). It contains gardens, a view of the Bay of Bengal, rides on horses and camels, and a skating rink. In December 2017, then-Chief Minister N. Chandrababu Naidu inaugurated a project to offer tourism by helicopter.

See also 
Dwaraka Nagar
Fintech Valley Vizag

References

Parks in Visakhapatnam
Tourist attractions in Visakhapatnam